Heinrich Rantzau or Ranzow (Ranzovius) (11 March 1526 – 31 December 1598) was a German humanist writer and statesman, a prolific astrologer and an associate of Tycho Brahe. He was son of Johan Rantzau. 
He was Governor of the Danish royal share in the Duchy of Holstein, a rich man and celebrated book collector. Rantzau is perhaps best remembered as a patron of scholars. His own Tractatus astrologicus de genethliacorum thematum appeared in 1597, and went through five editions by 1615. In his own time, he was regarded as a generous supporter of artists and writers in Lübeck, many of whom he engaged to write memorials of his father. Rantzau was also a successful merchant with trading interests in the east-west trade through Husum and Lübeck.

Rantzau was awarded the Danish Order of the Elephant in 1580 by King Frederick II of Denmark.

His oldest son Breide Rantzau was a councillor of the Danish realm, and a younger son, Gert Rantzau, was Captain of the castles of Kronborg and Flensburg.

He was the great-uncle of Josias von Rantzau, Marshal of France.

References

External links 

 Peter Zeeberg: Heinrich Rantzau (1526-98) and his humanist collaborators - The examples of Reiner Reineccius and Georg Ludwig Froben.

Editions
 Felgentreu, Fritz (ed., trans.). Heinrich Rantzau (Christianus Cilicius Cimber). Belli Dithmarsici vera descriptio: Wahre Beschreibung des Dithmarscher Krieges (Schleswig: Landesarchiv Schleswig-Holstein, 2009) (Veröffentlichungen des Landesarchivs Schleswig-Holstein, 86).

1526 births
1598 deaths
People from Steinburg
German astrologers
German astrological writers
German Renaissance humanists
German male writers
Heinrich